Vidkunn Hveding (27 March 1921 – 19 May 2001) was a Norwegian politician for the Conservative Party, and the Minister of Petroleum and Energy  from 1981–1983. Hveding was born in Orkdal, Sør-Trøndelag, and was a civil engineer by profession. He was married to Marie Palmstrøm (1 September 1926 – 1 October 1986) from 1948 to 1963, and remarried in 1963 to Tone Barth (25 January 1924 - 10 October 1980), the sister of Professor of Social Anthropology Fredrik Barth (b. 1928).

References

1921 births
2001 deaths
Petroleum and energy ministers of Norway
Conservative Party (Norway) politicians